Arsenio Larosa Jazmin (born 25 May 1935) is a Filipino sprinter. He competed in the men's 400 metres at the 1964 Summer Olympics.

References

1935 births
Living people
Athletes (track and field) at the 1964 Summer Olympics
Filipino male sprinters
Olympic track and field athletes of the Philippines
Place of birth missing (living people)